Simangna Mwktang is a 2005 Bodo language romantic horror film. It was the debut of Rajib Brahma and stars Sangina Brahma. The film was directed by Rojen Narzary.

Cast
 Rajib Brahma as Rindao
 Sangina Brahma as Juli and Somaina

Music
Songs in order of appearance in the movie.
 "Megonjwng Megon Nwjwra"- Binoy Daimary, Unknown
 "Ang Jabai Dani Jugni"- Binoy Daimary, Unknown
 "Dinwini Be Somao"- Binoy Daimary
 "Nwngni Saogari Bwjob Bwjob"- Unknown

See also
 Bodo films

References

Bodo-language films
Indian romantic horror films
2005 films